Star of Seville is a British-trained Thoroughbred racehorse. She won the French Oaks, the Prix de Diane, in 2015.

References

2012 racehorse births
Thoroughbred family 1-w
Racehorses bred in the United Kingdom
Racehorses trained in the United Kingdom